Thomas Biddulph may refer to:

 Thomas Myddelton Biddulph (1809–1878), British Army officer and courtier
 Thomas Tregenna Biddulph (1763–1838), English cleric